The American Music Hall, also known as the American Theater until 1908, was one of the oldest Broadway venues. Located at 260 West 42nd Street, it was designed by the architect Charles C. Haight, with a capacity of 2065. It opened on May 22, 1888.

By 1929, it was a Mutual burlesque house. On December 19, 1930, the interior was destroyed by a fire that started in the balcony after the evening performance of the Mutual show "Nite Life in Paris". With the Depression on, there was little interest in restoring the theater, and it was demolished in 1932.

References

External links

Former Broadway theatres
Former theatres in Manhattan
1893 establishments in New York (state)
Buildings and structures demolished in 1932
1930 fires in the United States
1932 disestablishments in New York (state)
Theatres completed in 1893
42nd Street (Manhattan)
Theater District, Manhattan
Demolished buildings and structures in Manhattan